Daniel L. Norris (August 30, 1935 – August 5, 2008) was the commissioner of the Northwest Territories from October 2, 1989 until September 30, 1994. Norris was born in 1935 near Inuvik and was raised in Aklavik. Norris died on August 5, 2008 from heart failure, a complication of his long-time struggle with diabetes.

Biography
Norris was born on August 30, 1935 near Inuvik in the Mackenzie Delta. Raised in Aklavik, Norris reportedly aspired to become a trapper like his father. Norris served for 27 years in the Northwest Territories government's public service, including four years spent as a regional administrator in the  Beaufort Delta. He began in the public sector in what was then the Department of Northern Affairs and National Resources, and rose within that Department to become its Regional Superintendent of Personnel.

On October 2, 1989, Norris was appointed as the territory's 11th Commissioner, making him the first Aboriginal born in the north of Canada to be appointed to that role. Between his appointment in 1989 and his leaving his role on September 30, 1994, Norris was forced to set out new protocols for the role of the Commissioner, as the position had some legislative function up until three years prior to Norris taking up the job.

Death
On August 5, 2008, Daniel Norris died in an Edmonton, Alberta hospital of heart failure, following a protracted struggle with diabetes. On August 7, Northwest Territories government buildings with flagpoles flew their flags at half-mast in memory of Norris, and on August 11, the day of his funeral, the same protocol was adopted.

References

1935 births
2008 deaths
Commissioners of the Northwest Territories
People from Inuvik
Deaths from diabetes
People from Aklavik